True Colours (released in the United States as True Colors) is the debut studio album by Welsh drum and bass producer High Contrast. Disc 1 is unmixed, and later released as a single CD album. The second disc is mixed and features most of the tracks of the first disc, and also includes the tracks "Suddenly" and "Full Intention."

Track listing

Disc one 
"Return of Forever" – 8:19
"Music Is Everything" – 7:29
"True Colours" – 6:08
"Global Love" – 6:11
"Exposé" – 6:20
"Passion" – 5:48
"Make It Tonight" – 6:25
"Remember When" – 7:17
"Savoir Faire" – 6:10
"Fools Gold" – 6:46
"Mermaid Scar" – 7:23

Disc two 
"Music Is Everything" – 4:27
"Global Love" – 2:13
"Savoir Faire" – 2:57
"Suddenly" – 2:57
"Remember When" – 3:41
"Passion" – 2:13
"True Colours" – 5:21
"Mermaid Scar" – 4:54
"Return of Forever" – 7:01
"Exposé" – 3:53
"Full Intention" – 5:55
"Make It Tonight" – 6:36

References 

High Contrast albums
2002 debut albums
Hospital Records albums